Tamhini Ghat is a mountain passage located between Mulshi and Tamhini in Maharashtra, India.

Situated on the crest of the Western Ghat mountain ranges, Tamhini Ghat is noted for its surroundings comprising scenic waterfalls, lakes and dense woods. The best time to visit is October through November.

History
Tamhini Ghat did not exist earlier, as the whole area is under [Tata Power]. Considering the requirement of additional routes to take traffic in Konkan from Pune and Lonawala this route was proposed.

Road
The Tamhini road ghat cuts the Sahyadri range to join Mulshi to Tamhini and makes the route in Konkan from Pune. This ghat stretches almost 15 km.  The road is now very good and newly laid. The entire stretch becomes a popular destination during the monsoons. During the rainy season, the place transforms into a green bed with many waterfalls and streams. There are state buses which ply through the ghat connecting Pune city with places on the Goa highway (NH17).

Tamhini Ghat can be accessed from Mumbai via the Mumbai-Goa Highway by reaching Kolad and after crossing the bridge over Kundalika River, take the left turn that leads to Pune via the Mulshi Dam backwaters. Tamhini Ghat is the stretch between Kolad and these backwaters. It contains different kinds of green velvety carpets, gushing streams, dark grey clouds stooping low, and the occasional waterfalls. These impromptu waterfalls attract tourists from far and wide.

From the Tamhini Ghat, the road that leads to the Mulshi Dam backwaters which goes to the waterfall at Palse. This particular waterfall is nowadays getting crowded. Further ahead is Kolad which is now becoming immensely popular for river rafting that you can do on the river Kundalika.

Rail 
The Central Railway Zone & Indian Railways planned a connection between Pimpri Chinchwad to Kolad of Konkan Railway in Maharshatra through a Railway. The project was termed Kundalika River Valley Railway. But the plan was scrapped following survey of the region, which opined on the facts that neither a Broad Gauge nor a Metre Gauge railway can be constructed in Tamhini Ghat Region. Later a survey was done again for construction of a Narrow Gauge line, but it was also scrapped.

References

External links
 https://www.youtube.com/watch?v=4Zht1T73W3k

Mountain passes of Maharashtra